Richard "the Iron" Bourke (Irish: Risdeárd an Iarainn Bourke; ; ; d. 1583), 18th Mac William Íochtar (Lower Mac William), was the an Irish chieftain and noble.

Bourke was a son of David de Búrca, 15th Mac William Íochtar, by his second wife, Finola Ni Flaithbertaigh. He succeeded his cousin, Seaán mac Oliver (John) Bourke, 17th Mac William Íochtar (d.1580), a great-grandson of Ricard Ó Cuairsge Bourke, 7th Mac William Íochtar (d.1479).

In English, he was known as Richard Bourke, or "Iron Richard". In medieval Ireland, Richard was a rare name, most found in Norman-origin families like the Bourkes. Richard was second husband to Grace O'Malley. He was the father of several children, including Tibbot ne Long Bourke, 1st Viscount Mayo (23rd Mac William Íochtar). 

During the uneven anglicisation of Ireland in the 1500s, by the policy of "Surrender and regrant", Richard signed an agreement with the Crown in 1581 which uniquely left him in autonomous control of his part of County Mayo.

Richard was succeeded, as Mac William Íochtar, by his predecessor's brother, Richard Bourke, 19th Mac William Íochtar (d.1586).

Genealogy

 Sir Edmond Albanach de Burgh (d. 1375),  1st Mac William Íochtar (Lower Mac William), (Mayo)
 William de Burgh (d.1368)
 Thomas mac Edmond Albanach de Burca, 1375–1402, 2nd Mac William Íochtar
 Walter mac Thomas de Burca (d.1440), 3rd Mac William Íochtar
 Theobald Bourke (d.1503), 8th Mac William Íochtar
 Meiler Bourke (d.1520), 11th Mac William Íochtar
 Ricard Bourke (d.1509), 9th Mac William Íochtar
 Seaán an Tearmainn Bourke (alive 1527), 13th Mac William Íochtar
 Ricard mac Seaán an Tearmainn Bourke (d.1571), 16th Mac William Íochtar
 Edmund na Féasóige de Burca, (d.1458), 4th Mac William Íochtar
 Ricard Ó Cuairsge Bourke (d.1473), 7th Mac William Íochtar
 Edmond de Burca (d.1527), 10th Mac William Íochtar
 Walter de Burca
 Seaán de Burca
 Oliver de Burca
 Seaán mac Oliver Bourke (d.1580), 17th Mac William Íochtar
 Richard Bourke (d.1586), 19th Mac William Íochtar
 Walter Ciotach de Burca of Belleek (d.1590)
 Tibbot (Theobald) MacWalter Kittagh Bourke, 21st Mac William Íochtar, 1st Marquess of Mayo
 Walter (Balthasar) Bourke, 2nd Marquess of Mayo
 Thomas Ruadh de Burca
 Uilleag de Burca
 Edmond de Burca (d.1527), 12th Mac William Íochtar
 David de Burca (alive 1537), 15th Mac William Íochtar
 Richard the Iron Bourke (d.1583), 18th Mac William Íochtar
 Tibbot (Theobald) ne Long Bourke (1567-1629), 23rd Mac William Íochtar, 1st Viscount Mayo (1627)
 Viscounts Mayo
 William "the Blind Abbot" Bourke (d.1593), 20th Mac William Íochtar
 Theobald mac Uilleag Bourke (d.1537), 14th Mac William Íochtar
 Risdeárd de Burca
 Ricard Deamhan an Chorráin de Burca
 Risdeárd Mac Deamhan an Chorráin (Richard) "the Devils Hook" Bourke (d.1601), 22nd Mac William Íochtar
 Seaán de Burca (d.1456)
 Tomás Óg de Burca, (d.1460), 5th Mac William Íochtar
 Risdeárd de Burca (d.1473), 6th Mac William Íochtar

References

Further reading
 The History of Mayo, Hubert T. Knox. 1908.
 Lower Mac William and Viscounts of Mayo, 1332-1649, in A New History of Ireland IX, pp. 235–36, Oxford, 1984 (reprinted 2002).

People from County Mayo
16th-century Irish people
1583 deaths
Richard the Iron
Year of birth unknown